Kuntz is a German surname.

Kuntz may also refer to:

 Kuntz Electroplating Incorporated, a surface finishing company
 Kuntz, former name of Mad River, California within Trinity County
 Kuntz Stadium, an outdoor soccer facility located in Indianapolis
 Marlene Kuntz, a rock band from Cuneo, Italy